Nira or NIRA may refer to:

Nira
Shivatkar (Nira), a town in southwestern Maharashtra state in India
Nira, a village in Israel, today part of Beit Yitzhak-Sha'ar Hefer
NIRA Dynamics AB, a Swedish company
Nira, a diminutive of the Russian female first name Avenira
Nira Dyn, Israeli mathematician
The Japanese term for garlic chives

NIRA
National Identification and Registration Authority
National Industrial Recovery Act of 1933, in USA
National Intercollegiate Rodeo Association
National Intercollegiate Rugby Association
New Irish Republican Army, another name for the Real Irish Republican Army
Nigeria Internet Registration Association
NIRA Intense Import Drag Racing, a 1999 video game